The Corraun Peninsula, also spelt Currane (Irish:An Corrán ), is a peninsula in County Mayo, on the west coast of Ireland. It extends out from the mainland towards Achill Island.

Thoroughfares on the peninsula include the Great Western Greenway, which passes through the north side of the peninsula, following a scenic route.

As of 2016 the population of the Corraun peninsula was 726. The entire peninsula is in the Gaeltacht (designated Irish speaking region) with 12% of the population claiming to speak Irish on a daily basis outside the education system. The peninsula is immediately east of Achill Island, and forms part of the parish of Achill.  It comprises the villages of Tornragee, Polranny, Belfarsad, Corraun (Currane) and Dogh Beg.

Achill Island is connected to the peninsula via the Michael Davitt Bridge.

Corraun is dominated by Corraun Hill (524 m). There are views of Clew Bay and the Mullet Peninsula to the north.

Sport 
Corraun is the home of Fr Griffin Park, the Community Sports Field overlooking views of Croagh Patrick, Achillbeg Island and Clare Island. It hosts rugby, Gaelic football, and soccer matches.

Mulranny United Football Club play all their home league games here. In the past it has also hosted Achill Rovers.

Gallery

References

Peninsulas of County Mayo
Gaeltacht places in County Mayo
County Mayo articles missing geocoordinate data